The 1967 Cupa României Final was the 29th final of Romania's most prestigious football cup competition. It was disputed between Steaua București and Foresta Fălticeni, and was won by Steaua București after a game with 6 goals. It was the 8th cup for Steaua București.

Foresta Fălticeni become the first club representing Divizia C which reached the Romanian Cup final.

Match details

See also 
List of Cupa României finals

References

External links
Romaniansoccer.ro

1967
Cupa
Romania